Kuresa Nasau is a Tokelauan politician who has served as head of government five times and as  of Atafu.

He lost his seat in the 2011 election, but was re-elected in 2014. He lost his seat again in the 2017 election. In 2017, after the election, it was revealed that he had made several controversial capital investment decisions, including the purchase of two helicopters.

Terms of office as :
February 1998 – February 1999
February 2001 – February 2002
February 2007 – February 2008
22 March 2010 – 11 March 2011
February 2014 – 23 February 2015

References 

Year of birth missing (living people)
Heads of Government of Tokelau
Members of the Parliament of Tokelau
People from Atafu
Living people